Protein Wnt-8b is a protein that in humans is encoded by the WNT8B gene.

The WNT gene family consists of structurally related genes that encode secreted signaling proteins. These proteins have been implicated in oncogenesis and in several developmental processes, including regulation of cell fate and patterning during embryogenesis. 

This gene is a member of the WNT gene family. It encodes a protein showing 95%, 86%, and 71% amino acid identity to the mouse, zebrafish and Xenopus Wnt8B proteins, respectively. The expression patterns of the human and mouse genes appear identical and are restricted to the developing brain. The chromosomal location of this gene to 10q24 suggests it as a candidate gene for partial epilepsy.

References

Further reading